The Rip Curl Pro, formerly the Bells Beach Surf Classic, is a WSL (formerly ASP) World Tour surfing competition held in and around Torquay, Victoria and sponsored by surf company Rip Curl. The event is based at Bells Beach, Victoria, Australia. The event winner is awarded the prestigious 'Bell' trophy.

The song "Hells Bells" by AC/DC is played every morning before the first competition.

History
The competition has been held annually at Easter time at Bells Beach, Victoria continuously since 1962, becoming a professional competition and sponsored by Rip Curl in 1973. The contest has had various sponsors over the years, including in 1984 Australian rock band, Australian Crawl.

The first Bells Beach contest was supposed to be held in late 1961 but was delayed until the Australia day weekend of 1962.  The first winner was NSW surfer Glynn Ritchie.  Occasionally George "Ming" Smith is credited as winning the 1961 event but he actually won the "wave of the day" in the first contest (1962) and was awarded a prize of 1 pound, and a pennant saying "winner 1961".

The event became mobile from 1993, and was held at various locations in Victoria, depending upon weather conditions.  The entire 2005 event was held at Phillip Island due to poor conditions in Torquay.  The event is now held only at Bells Beach and nearby Winkipop.

The famous Bells trophy was designed and built by Bells Beach local Joe Sweeney. Winners of the Rip Curl Pro receive smaller replica Bells trophies to keep. Each year, Rip Curl founder Doug 'Claw' Warbrick presents the trophies to the winning athletes.

The 2020 and 2021 contests were cancelled due to the COVID-19 pandemic.

Naming
Since the birth of this competition it had different names.

Results

Men

Women

See also

 Quiksilver Pro Gold Coast
 Margaret River Pro

References

Bibliography
 Mark Richards: A Surfing Legend, authorised biography by David Knox, 1992, 
 The Ol' Girl, Tracks magazine, March 2006 (listing men's winners 1973 to 2005)
Kelly Slater Wins 2006 Rip Curl Pro, by Nick Carroll at Surfing Magazine.

External links
 ASP World Tour Rankings & Results 

World Surf League
Surfing competitions in Australia
Sports competitions in Victoria (Australia)
Recurring sporting events established in 1973
1973 establishments in Australia